Sanskrit has inherited from its theorised parent the Proto-Indo-European language an elaborate system of nominal morphology. Endings may be added directly to the root, or more frequently and especially in the later language, to a stem formed by the addition of a suffix to it.

Sanskrit is a highly inflected language that preserves all the declensional types found in Proto-Indo-European, including a few residual heteroclitic r/n-stems.

Basics 

Declension of a noun in Sanskrit involves the interplay of two 'dimensions': three numbers and eight cases, yielding a combination of 24 possible forms, although owing to syncretism of some forms, the practical number is around 19 or so. Further, nouns themselves in Sanskrit, like its parent Proto-Indo-European, can be in one of three genders. 

In addition, adjectives behave much the same way morphologically as nouns do, and can conveniently be considered together. While the same noun cannot be seen to be of more than one gender, adjectives change gender on the basis of the noun they are being applied to, along with case and number, thus giving the following variables:

Building blocks

Roots 

The oldest system of declension was to affix the endings directly to the nominal root. This was an ancient feature already in decline in later Proto-Indo-European. Of the daughter languages, this system has been best preserved by Sanskrit, especially the older form of Indo-Aryan termed Vedic Sanskrit.

Stems 

In Proto-Indo-European, a new system developed wherein an intermediary called the thematic vowel is inserted to the root before the final endings are appended: *-o- which in Sanskrit becomes -a-, producing the thematic stem. 

Declension of a thematic stem is less complicated owing to the fact that a host of Sandhi rules apply no more, and the later stages of the Sanskrit language see an increase in the profusion of thematic nouns. Thus in classical Sanskrit, the thematic pā́da-s is more likely to be found than its athematic predecessor.

Cases 

Sanskrit nouns are declined for eight cases:

nominative: marks the subject of a verb. 
accusative: used for the direct object of a transitive verb.
instrumental: marks the means by which the subject achieves or accomplishes an action, physically or abstractly.
dative: used to indicate the indirect object of a transitive verb.
ablative: used to express motion away from something.
genitive: marks a noun as modifying another noun.
locative: corresponds vaguely to the English prepositions in, on, at, and by.
vocative: used for a word that identifies an addressee.

The kāraka classification 

In the ancient literature, Pāṇini identified six classes as kārakas, operating as accessories to a verb. The six kārakas are the nominative, accusative, instrumental, dative, ablative, and locative cases. He defined them as follows (Aṣtādhyāyi, I.4.24–54):

 Kartā : 'he/that which is independent in action'. This is equivalent to the nominative case. 
Karman : 'what the agent seeks most to attain': the accusative.
   'that which effects most': the instrumental.
 Sampradāna : 'he whom one aims at with the object': the dative.
Apādāna : '(that which is) firm when departure (takes place)': the ablative.
  : or 'substratum': the locative.

Pāṇini did not identify the genitive Sambandha and vocative Sambodhana as kārakas.

Endings 

The basic scheme of suffixion is given in the table below and applies to many nouns and adjectives. 

However, according to the gender and the final consonant or vowel of the uninflected word-stem, there are internal sandhi rules dictating the form of the inflected word. Furthermore, these are standalone forms, which when used in actual phrases are subject to external sandhi, such as, the mutation of -s to -ḥ or -r and so on.

Declension

Classification

Substantives may be divided into different classes on the basis of the stem vowel before they are declined on the above basis. The general classification is:

 Short-vowel stems
 a-stems
 i- and u-stems
 ṛ-stems
 Long-vowel stems
 ā-stems
 ī- and ū-stems
 Diphthong stems
 Consonant stems
 Bare stems
 as/is/us-stems
 an- and in-stems
 ant-/mant-/vant-stems
 vāṅs-stems

When the nominal endings are being affixed to a noun of each class, they may undergo, in some cases, some changes, including being entirely replaced by other forms. This happens most profusely in the a-stem class. However, for reasons noted below, grammars both traditional and modern tend to start with this class.

a-stems

The vast majority of nouns in Sanskrit belong to this class, and are masculine or neuter. The position of the accent is maintained throughout, except in the masculine vocative singular. The paradigms are illustrated in their pre-sandhi forms, along with the formation treatment using two stems in the masculine devá-   and kā́ma-  and two in the neuter yugá-  and phála-  with different syllables accented.

a-stem adjectives are also to be found in big numbers, they are invariably masculine or neuter – feminines being formed either in -ā or, less frequently -ī. a-stem adjectives are also declined as below. 

Neuters only differ from the masculine in the nominative and accusative forms, the two forms always being the same:

i- and u-stems

i-stems 

Final i-stem endings are closer to the standard set compared to the a-stem declension. In general, the -i is gunated in some cases, and a -n- is inserted intervocalically between the stem and the ending in a few other cases, especially in the neuter. The paradigms are illustrated here in their pre-sandhi forms for masculine agní- , feminine gáti-  and neuter vā́ri- .

Neuters as always remain identical in the nominative and accusative, and also in the vocative. In the other cases, a -n- is inserted between the stem and the standard endings in all those cases where to avoid a collision of two vowels, making the whole process almost perfectly straightforward.

u-stems

i- and u-stem declensions are so similar that they can be grouped together. The u-stem paradigms illustrated here in their pre-sandhi forms are for masculine śátru- , feminine dhenú-  and neuter mádhu- .

Neuters are also just as straightforward as for i-stems. 
 

i- and u-stem adjectives are a small class of so—called primary adjectives, such as bahus, -us, -u  and śucis, -is, -i , as well as ones adapted from nouns like bahuvrīhis. They are inflected like the i- and u-stem nouns described above; occasionally the feminine u may gain an additional ī and become vī.

ṛ-stems
ṛ-stems are predominantly agental derivatives like dātṛ , though also include kinship terms like pitṛ , mātṛ , and svasṛ .  The neuter equivalents of derivative agental nouns once again form secondary stems in -n, as in the -i and -u classes.

A single irregular i-stem noun, sakhi , has a stem in -i but declines similarly to the above – simply with y i ī taking the place of r ṛ ṝ:

ā, ī- and ū-stems
This category is made of ā-, ī- and ū-stems, almost entirely feminine, polysyllabic derivative nouns.

ā-stems
A few forms deviate from the standard in many of which an interspersed -y- can be observed. The vocative also undergoes the usual accent shift.

ī- and ū-stems

Again most ī- and ū-stem nouns are feminine. ī- and ū-stem adjectives also belong here.

Diphthong stems 
Stems ending in Sanskrit diphthongs (e, ai, o, au) follow a fairly regular pattern, whilst subject to sandhi rules as usual.

Bare-consonant and as/us/is-stem nouns
Consonant stem nouns may have up to 3 different stems, as well as two special forms:
 A special lengthened form for the masculine/feminine nominative singular
 A special lengthened and/or nasalized form for the neuter nom/acc. plural
 A strong stem used for masc./fem. sing. acc., dual nom./acc. and plur. nom.
 A medium stem  used with oblique cases with consonant endings, as well as the neuter nom./acc. sing.
 A weak stem  used everywhere else.

One or more of these stems may be identical for some words, but this is generally not regularly predictable from either the nominative singular or the citation form stem. While the stem ending may undergo expected internal sandhi changes as normal, the endings themselves are gracefully regular.

an-stem nouns and in-stem adjectives

an-stem nouns and in-stem adjectives (occurring prolifically in masc. and neu.) show very similar behavior and can be grouped together:

ant-, mant- and vant-stem adjectives

Participial forms in -ant/-at decline as below, with some stem variation with the -n-.. Possessives in -mant and vant- display similar behavior, the difference that stands out is the nom. sing. masc. -mān & -vān. Forms not mentioned fit the existing pattern with full regularity:

vāṅs-stem perfect participles 
These forms exhibit similarities with the -vant stems illustrated above, with the main exception that in the weakest forms, before vowel endings, -vāṅs is zero-graded alongside the disappearance of the -ṅ-.

Comparatives and superlatives

Primary derivation

A small closed class of comparatives and superlatives are directly formed on adjectival roots, after dropping the original stem suffix. The comparative takes the suffix -īyān (yāṃsas), yasī, yas, which declines as a consonant- and ī-stem adjective; the superlative takes -iṣṭhas, ā, am. The root is strengthened to the guṇa grade.

 from mahān , root mah-, is formed mahīyān, mahiṣṭhas;

In some adjectives the original form of the root has been obscured by internal sandhi, making the outcome somewhat irregular. Thus: 

 from gur-us , originally , comes garīyān, gariṣṭhas;

Secondary derivation

The secondary suffixes of comparison are -taras, ā, am for comparative and -tamas, ā, am for superlative. They are appended to the inflectional base, with no modification of the stem. Usually, the pada stem is used for consonant-stem adjectives, but those in a simple -n sometimes retain it. 

 priyatara-, priyatama- from priya-;
 vṛṣatara-, vṛṣatama- from vṛṣan-, but vṛṣantama- is also attested.

Numerals

Cardinal numbers 

The numbers from one to ten, along with cognates in closely-related languages, are:

All numbers in Sanskrit can be declined in all the cases. From one to four, the cardinal numerals agree with the substantive they qualify in number, gender and case; from 5 to 19, in number and case, with only one form for all genders; from 20 onwards in case only.

The numbers from 11 to 19 are:

ékādaśam, dvā́daśam, tráyodaśam, cáturdaśam, páñcadaśam, saptádaśam, návadaśam.

The tens from 20 to 90 are:

(pañcāśát, saptatí, aśītí, navatí.

The joint numbers:

21 – , 22 – , 23 – , ..., 26 – , ..., but 82 – dvā́́śīti, 83 – trayā́śīti, 88 – .

The hundreds are:

śatam, dvai śatai,  śatāni / tri śatam, etc.

The larger numbers:

Compounding numbers 

All the numerals may be compounded attributively in their stem form:

Ordinal numbers 

The ordinal numbers from one to ten are:

 prathamás, -ā́
 dvitī́yas, -ā
 , -ā
 caturthás, -ī́
 pañcamás, -ī́
 , -ī
 saptamás, -ī́
 , -ī́
 navamás, -ī́
 daśamás, -ī́

Other numbers:

11. – ekādaśás, ... 20. – , 30. – , 40. – , 50. – pañcāśattamás, 60. – , 70. – saptatitamás, 80. – aśītitamás, 90. – navatitamás, 100. – śatatamás, 1000. – sahasratamás.

Pronouns and determiners

Sanskrit pronouns and determiners behave in their declension largely like other declinable classes such as nouns, adjectives and numerals, so that they can all be classed together under nominals. However, pronouns and determiners display certain peculiarities of their own compared to the other nominal classes. 

Furthermore, personal pronouns have an additional dimension not present in the other nominals, but shared by verbs: person.

Pronouns are declined for case, number, and gender. The pronominal declension applies to a few adjectives as well. Many pronouns have alternative enclitic forms.

The official list of Sanskrit pronouns is: sarva, viśva, ubha, ubhaya, utara, utama, anya, anyatara, tvat, tva, nema, sama, sima, pūrva, para, avara, dakṣiṇa, uttara, apara, adhara, sva, antara; tyad, tad, yad, etad, idam, adam; eka, dvi, yuṣmad, asmad, and kim.

First- and second-person pronouns

Sanskrit pronouns in the first and second person are theoretically termed asmad and yuṣmad respectively. 

They resemble one another in how they are declined, and similarly do not mark gender.  These pronouns have shortened, enclitic forms in the accusative, dative, and genitive cases (parenthesized in the table below).

The forms mad, asmad, tvad and yuṣmad can be used in derivation and composition: mát·kṛta, mát·sakhi, tvát·pitṛ, etc.

Demonstratives
Sanskrit does not have true third person pronouns, but its demonstratives play this role when they stand independently of a substantive. The four different demonstratives in Sanskrit are: 

 tad, adas
 idam, etad

Both tad and adas are used for objects of reference that are far away, the latter being more emphatic. Both are translated by the English distal demonstrative that.  

By contrast, idam and etad are used for nearby objects, and, again, the latter is more emphatic and has a strong deictic meaning. These two pronouns are translated by the English proximal demonstrative this.

The masculine singular nominative form of tad, sas exhibits irregular sandhi behaviour — before consonants saḥ becomes sa, giving, for instance, sa gajaḥ  rather than the expected *so gajaḥ.

etad, is declined almost identically to tad. Its paradigm is obtained by prefixing e- to all the forms of tat.

The declension of idam is somewhat irregular because it is formed from two different stems, i- and a-. The nominative and accusative forms, except the three singular nominatives, are regularly formed with the stem im-, and the remaining forms from a-; an extra -n- is infixed should the ending start with a vowel.

Most of the forms for adas are regularly formed using the stem u- the same way as if it were a-, with the combination *ui- becoming ī- in the plural. The nominative dual and instrumental singular are formed like u-stem nouns.

Possessive pronouns

asmad allows the following forms of possessive pronouns:

 madīya-, māmaka-, māmakīna-
 asmadīya-, asmāka-, asmākīna-

The feminines are in -ā.

yuṣmad has these:

 tvadīya-, tāvaka-, tāvakīna-
 yuṣmadīya-, yauṣmāka-, yauṣmākīṇa-

tad and etad have tadīya- and etadīya- respectively.

The feminines are again in -ā, except the -aka forms where it is -akī. These are all conjugated like regular a-, ā and ī-stem forms.

Polite pronoun
Technically a noun, bhavant  literally means 'Your Honour' and is treated like a third-person subject.  It carries, however, a second person meaning and connotes politeness.  This is declined very much like any vant-stem adjective.

This use of bhavant is common enough to suggest that the word should be treated as a polite variant of the second person pronoun, rather than as a more elaborate honorific construction.  Bhavant declines like all stems ending in -ant.

In talking of someone not present, one may use tatrabhavant, and conversely for someone present, atrabhavant, whether being addressed or not.

Enclitic pronouns
The enclitic pronoun enam is found only in a few oblique cases and numbers.  It is unemphatic and mostly refers to persons.

The k-y-t series of interrogative, relative, and correlative pronouns
In Sanskrit, interrogative and relative pronouns are formed analogously to tat.  The interrogative pronoun kim is declined like tat, replacing the initial t or s with k.  The only exception to this rule is the neuter nominative/accusative singular form, which is kim rather than the expected *kat. The relative pronoun yat is declined like tat, without exception replacing the initial t or s with y.  

The demonstrative tat functions as a correlative pronoun when used in "independent clauses that 'complete' relative clauses to form complex sentences"—unlike in English (where one can say, for example,  "The girl with whom you were speaking is my sister"), relative pronouns must be accompanied by correlative pronouns (which, if applied to the previous example, would be: "The girl with whom you are speaking, she is my sister").  

For a Sanskrit example of a complex sentence using corresponding relative and correlative pronouns, consider:  ('In the forest where Rāma lives, there are no demons'). In that example, the pronouns are alike in gender, number, and case, but matching relative–correlative pronouns need not be alike in case—for example: yena puruṣeṇa saha bhāṣate nṛpaḥ sa muniḥ ('The man with whom the king is speaking is a sage').

Indefinite and absolute negative phrases
Aside from their primary uses, the interrogative and relative pronouns are also used to form indefinite phrases.  The two ways of forming indefinite phrases are:
placing a relative pronoun before its corresponding interrogative pronoun, which in turn is followed by the particle api (for example: yat kim api, which means 'something or another'), and
placing one of api, cana, or cit after the interrogative pronoun (for example: kiṃcit, which means 'something').
As is evident in the examples, the first method of indicating indefiniteness is stronger, while the latter is more subtle and can simply be translated by an indefinite article in English. 

The absolute negative, semantically functioning as the negation of existential quantification, is formed by negating an indefinite phrase.

Reflexive pronouns
There are a number of words in Sanskrit that function as reflexive pronouns.  The indeclinable svayam can indicate reflexivity pertaining to subjects of any person or number, and—since subjects in Sanskrit can appear in the nominative, instrumental, or genitive cases—it can have the sense of any of these cases.  The noun ātman ('self') and adjective svaḥ ('own'; cf. Latin ) decline so as to express reflexivity in any case, person, and number. The former is always in the masculine, even when used in relation to a female subject, but the latter declines for gender.

Pronominal adjectives
Several adjectives in Sanskrit are declined pronominally.  That is, their declension differs from ordinary adjectival declension of a-stems and instead follows the declension of tat in certain respects.  
anya ('other'), anyatara ('either'), itara ('other'), katara ('which of two?'), katama ('which of many?'), and ekatama ('one of many') all follow the tat paradigm exactly.
sarva ('every', 'all'), ubhaya ('both'), eka ('one'), and ekatara ('either') follow the tat paradigm except in the neuter nominative/accusative singular, ending in -m rather than -t.
pūrva ('prior', 'east'), avara ('posterior', 'west'), adhara ('inferior', 'west'), uttara ('subsequent', 'north'), dakṣiṇa ('south'), para ('subsequent', 'other', 'opposite'), apara ('other', 'inferior'), antara ('outer'), and sva ('own') follow the tat paradigm except (1) in the neuter nominative/accusative singular, ending in -am rather than -at; (2) in the masculine/neuter ablative and locative singular, sometimes (though not necessarily) ending in -āt and -e rather than -asmāt and -asmin; and (3) in the masculine nominative plural, sometimes (though not necessarily) ending in -āḥ rather than -e.
ardha ('half'), alpa ('little'), katipaya ('some'), prathama ('first'), carama ('last'), and dvaya/dvitaya ('twofold') generally follow the regular adjective declension for a-stems but sometimes (though not necessarily) follow tat in the masculine nominative plural, ending in -e rather than -āḥ.
dvitīya ('second') and tṛtīya ('third') optionally follow the declension of tat in the forms of the oblique cases in the singular.

Note that when any of these adjectives are at the end of a compound, they decline exactly like ordinary a-stem adjectives.

Nominal derivation
Derivation or word-formation in Sanskrit can be divided into the following types:

 Primary derivation – suffixes directly appended to roots
 Secondary derivation – suffixes appended to derivative stems
 Word-compounding – combining one more word stems

Primary derivatives

The root usually undergoes some change of form first, typically to first-grade, or in some cases second-grade, strengthening. A final -n or -m may sometimes be lost, a short vowel may be first followed by a -t, a final palatal or h may revert  to the corresponding guttural, and so on.

a-suffix derivatives

A very large number of derivatives are formed under this category, with several semantic outcomes and with varying treatment of the root, including gradation, reduplication and no change.

 With guṇa-grading, wherever possible
 Action nouns
 √grah- ⇒ gráha- 
 √i- ⇒ áya- 
 √vid- ⇒ véda- 
 √tṝ- ⇒ tára- 
 √sṛj- ⇒ sárga- 
 Agent nouns
 √jīv- ⇒ jīvá- 
 √sṛ- ⇒ sará- 
 √sṛp- ⇒ sarpá- 
 √kṣam- ⇒ kṣamá- 
 With vṛddhi-grading, where the final outcome has an ā
 Action nouns
 √kam- ⇒ kā́ma- 
 √bhaj- ⇒ bhā́ga- 
 √tṝ- ⇒ tā́ra- 
 Agent nouns
 √gṛh- ⇒ grābhá- 
 √vah- ⇒ vāhá- 
 √ni- ⇒ nāyá-

ti-suffix derivatives
Another large class, mostly feminine action nouns, with some masculine agent nouns and adjectives. The root remains in zero-grade form, largely like past passive participles in -tá.

 √bhaj- ⇒ bhaktí- 
 √stu- ⇒ stutí- 
 √pṝ- ⇒ pūrtí- 
 √gam- ⇒ gáti- 
 √man- ⇒ matí- 
 √dṛś- ⇒ dṛ́ṣṭi- 
 √vac- ⇒ úkti- 
 √vṛdh- ⇒ vṛ́ddhi-

man-suffix derivatives

This is another productive category (PIE *-men), mostly of action-noun formations. 

 √kṛ- ⇒ kárman- 
 √dhṛ- ⇒ dhárman- 
 √vṛt- ⇒ vártman- 
 nā́man- 
 bráhman- 
 brahmán- 
 áśman-

tar-suffix derivatives

tṛ- or tar-suffix derivatives, mostly agent nouns (PIE *-tor, English -er).

 √kṛ- ⇒ kártṛ 
 √dā- ⇒ dātṛ 
 √gam- ⇒ gantṛ 
 √hu- ⇒ hotṛ 

Several basic kinship nouns are classed under here.

 √pā- ⇒ pitṛ́ 
 mātṛ́ 
 bhrā́tṛ 
 √duh- ⇒ duhitṛ́

tra-suffix derivatives

Typically nouns expressing the means of doing something.

 √pā- ⇒ pā́tra- 
 √man- ⇒ mántra- 
 √vas- ⇒ vástra- 
 √rāj- ⇒ rāṣṭrá-

Secondary derivatives

This is used primarily to form words of adjectival meaning, and with the first vowel usually undergoing vṛddhi-grade strengthening.

a-suffix derivatives

A very productive class, nouns or adjectives that denote a relationship. Patronymics are also derived in this manner.

 mánas- ⇒ mānasá- 
 bráhman- ⇒ brāhmaṇá- 
 Marút- ⇒ mā́ruta- 
 Mánus- ⇒ mā́nuṣa-

ya-suffix derivatives

Another very productive class. Closely related are -iya- and -īya- formations. 

 devá- ⇒ daívya- 
 loká- ⇒ laúkya- 
 púṃs- ⇒ paúṃsya- 
 gó- ⇒ gávya- 
 sánt- ⇒ satyá- 

-iya- is used after a consonant cluster:

 kṣatrá- ⇒ kṣatríya- 
 yajñá- ⇒ yajñíya- 
 índra- ⇒ indriyá- 
 kṣétra- ⇒ kṣetriyá-

tā and tva-suffix derivatives

These suffixes denote the quality of being, analogous to '-ness' and '-hood' in English. Cf Lat -tas (-ty), Slavic *-ьstvo. Coupled with the prefix a- 'un-', the sense of '-lessness' is derived.

 devá·tā 
 nagná·tā 
 a·gó·tā 
 a·paśú·tā 
 a·mṛta·tvá 
 bhrātṛ·tvá 
 śatru·tvá

Compounds

See also
Sanskrit verbs
Sanskrit grammar
Vedic Sanskrit grammar
Proto-Indo-Aryan
Proto-Indo-Iranian
Proto-Indo-European

Notes

Glossary

Traditional glossary and notes

References

Bibliography

  		
 
 
 W. D. Whitney, The Roots, Verb-Forms and Primary Derivatives of the Sanskrit Language (A Supplement to His Sanskrit Grammar)
 Coulson, Michael. Teach Yourself Sanskrit. Oxford: Hodder and Stoughton, 1986.
 
 
 
 Macdonell, A. A. A Sanskrit Grammar for Students. London: Oxford UP, 1927.
Delbrück, B. Altindische Tempuslehre (1876) 
 Goldman, Robert P. & Sally J. . Berkeley: Center for South Asian Studies, 2004.
Wackernagel, Debrunner, Altindische Grammatik, Göttingen.
vol. I. phonology  Jacob Wackernagel (1896)
vol. II.1. introduction to morphology, nominal composition, Wackernagel (1905) 
vol. II.2. nominal suffixes, J. Wackernagel and Albert Debrunner (1954)
vol. III. nominal inflection, numerals, pronouns, Wackernagel and Debrunner (1930)

Noun
Vyakarana
Declension
Indo-Aryan grammars
Indo-Iranian grammars
Indo-European grammars